"I Don't Know About You" is a song recorded by American country music singer Chris Lane. It was released in 2018 as the second single from his second major-label album Laps Around the Sun. Ashley Gorley, Hardy, Hunter Phelps, and Jameson Rodgers are the song's writers.

Content and history
Taste of Country describes the song as a "slow jam" which "finds the singer walking into a bar to find a girl he's determined to get to know." It features a "rhythmic singing style" in which the song's narrator wants to get to know a woman more closely after encountering her in a bar.

Commercial performance
The song was certified Gold by the RIAA on June 20, 2019 for half a million units in sales and streams. It has sold 175,000 copies in the United States as of January 2020. He performed this song at the 95th Macy's Thanksgiving Day Parade in 2021. In 2022 it was certified triple platinum for 3,000,000 equivalent units.

Charts

Weekly charts

Year-end charts

Certifications

References

2018 singles
Chris Lane songs
Big Loud singles
Song recordings produced by Joey Moi
2018 songs
Songs written by Hardy (singer)
Songs written by Ashley Gorley
Songs written by Jameson Rodgers